The House at 200 Corsica Avenue is a historic home in Tampa, Florida. On August 3, 1989, it was added to the U.S. National Register of Historic Places.

References

External links
 Hillsborough County listings at the National Register of Historic Places

Gallery

Houses in Tampa, Florida
History of Tampa, Florida
Houses on the National Register of Historic Places in Hillsborough County, Florida
Mediterranean Revival architecture of Davis Islands, Tampa, Florida